Summation notation may refer to:

Capital-sigma notation, mathematical symbol for summation
Einstein notation, summation over like-subscripted indices